Manakondur Assembly constituency is a SC reserved constituency of Telangana Legislative Assembly, India. It is one among 13 constituencies in Karimnagar district. It is part of Karimnagar Lok Sabha constituency.

Rasamayi Balakishan, chairman of Telangana Samskruthika Sarathi won the seat in the 2014 Assembly election.

Mandals
The Assembly Constituency presently comprises the following Mandals:

Members of Legislative Assembly

Election results

Telangana Legislative Assembly election, 2018

Telangana Legislative Assembly election, 2014

See also
 List of constituencies of Telangana Legislative Assembly

References

Assembly constituencies of Telangana
Karimnagar district